The Dick Suderman Trophy for the Grey Cup's Most Valuable Canadian (Le Canadien le plus précieux de la Coupe Grey) is awarded annually to the Canadian player deemed to have the best performance in the Grey Cup game, the championship of the Canadian Football League. This award is presented before the Grey Cup trophy is presented.

The winner does not necessarily have to play for the Grey Cup winning team in order to qualify.

The award was introduced at the 1971 Grey Cup, and the first winner was Dick Suderman, a Canadian defensive end. A year later, just six weeks before the playing of the 1972 Grey Cup, Suderman collapsed and died from a brain hemorrhage after playing a regular season game; the trophy was subsequently renamed in his honour.

Player achievements
The most wins by a player is three, for both Don Sweet (completed in 1979) and Dave Sapunjis (completed in 1995). Four other four players have won the award twice each.

Dave Sapunjis is the only player to win the award in consecutive (1991, 1992) Grey Cup games.

Garry Lefebvre is the only player to be awarded the trophy for his performance at three distinct positions, in three distinct aspects, during a single (1973) Grey Cup game: defensive back, part of the defense unit of the team; punter, part of the special teams unit of the team; and wide receiver, part of the offense unit of the team. Four other players (one a double winner) have been awarded the trophy for their performance in playing the two distinct, yet related, positions of punter and placekicker. 

Andrew Harris and Hénoc Muamba are the only players to win both the Dick Suderman Trophy and the Grey Cup Most Valuable Player award in the same Grey Cup game.

Dick Suderman Trophy winners

Team achievements
Teams represented by Dick Suderman Trophy winners through the years.

Notes:

See also
Grey Cup Most Valuable Player

Grey Cup
Canadian Football League trophies and awards
Awards established in 1971
1971 establishments in Canada